Alternative country, or alternative country rock (sometimes alt-country, insurgent country, Americana, or y'allternative), is a loosely defined subgenre of country music and/or country rock that includes acts that differ significantly in style from mainstream country music, mainstream country rock, and country pop. Alternative country artists are often influenced by alternative rock. Most frequently, the term has been used to describe certain country music and country rock bands and artists that are also defined as or have incorporated influences from alternative rock, heartland rock, Southern rock, progressive country, outlaw country, neotraditional country, Texas country, Red Dirt, honky-tonk, bluegrass, rockabilly, psychobilly, roots rock, indie rock, hard rock, folk revival, indie folk, folk rock, folk punk, punk rock, cowpunk, blues punk, blues rock, emocore, post-hardcore, and rhythm 'n' blues.

Definitions and characteristics

In the 1990s the term alternative country, paralleling alternative rock, began to be used to describe a diverse group of musicians and singers operating outside the traditions and industry of mainstream country music. Many eschewed the increasingly polished production values and pop sensibilities of the Nashville-dominated industry for a more lo-fi sound, frequently infused with a strong punk and rock and roll aesthetic. Lyrics may be bleak or socially aware, but also more heartfelt and less likely to use the clichés sometimes used by mainstream country musicians. In other respects, the musical styles of artists that fall within this genre often have little in common, ranging from traditional American folk music and bluegrass, through rockabilly and honky-tonk, to music that is indistinguishable from mainstream rock or country. This already broad labeling has been further confused by alternative country artists disavowing the movement, mainstream artists declaring they are part of it, and retroactive claims that past or veteran musicians are alternative country. No Depression, the best-known magazine dedicated to the genre, declared that it covered "alternative-country music (whatever that is)".

History
Alternative country drew on traditional American country music, the music of working people, preserved and celebrated by practitioners such as Woody Guthrie, Hank Williams, and The Carter Family, often cited as major influences. Another major influence was country rock, the result of fusing country music with a rock & roll sound. The artist most commonly thought to have originated country rock is Gram Parsons (who referred to his sound as "Cosmic American Music"), although Michael Nesmith, Steve Earle and Gene Clark are frequently identified as important innovators. The third factor was punk rock, which supplied an energy and DIY attitude.

Attempts to combine punk and country had been pioneered by Nashville's Jason and the Scorchers, and in the 1980s Southern Californian cowpunk scene with bands like the Long Ryders and X, and the Minneapolis-based band The Jayhawks, but these styles merged fully in Uncle Tupelo's 1990 LP No Depression, which is widely credited as being the first "alt-country" album, and gave its name to the online notice board and eventually magazine that underpinned the movement. They released three more influential albums, signing to a major label, before they broke up in 1994, with members and figures associated with them going on to form three major bands in the genre: Wilco, Son Volt and Bottle Rockets. Bottle Rockets signed, along with acts like Freakwater, Old 97's and Robbie Fulks, to the Chicago-based indie label, Bloodshot, who pioneered a version of the genre under the name insurgent country. The bands Blue Mountain, Whiskeytown, Blood Oranges and Drive-By Truckers further developed this tradition before most began to move more in the direction of rock music in the 2000s.

See also
List of alternative country musicians
Americana (music) 
Heartland rock
Red Dirt (music)
Southern rock
Southern metal
Outlaw country
Gothic country
Indie folk
Texas country music
Progressive country
Country rock
Cow punk

Suggested listening
 Alternative Country Edition (EMM) (2009) - 2XCD various artist compilation
 Sounds of the New West (Uncut) (1998) - various artist compilation
 New Folk Sounds: The Best of Alternative Country (Universal Music) (2008) -  2XCD various artist compilation
                    ●
 For a Life of Sin (Bloodshot) (1984) various Insurgent country artists
 Hellbent: Insurgent Country Vol. 2 (Bloodshot) (1995) - various artists
 Nashville: Insurgent Country Vol. 3 (Bloodshot) (1996) - various artists

References
Notes

Bibliography
 Alden, Grant; & Blackstock, Peter (1998). No Depression: An Introduction to Alternative Country Music. Whatever That Is. Dowling Pr. .
 Goodman, David (1999).  Modern Twang: An Alternative Country Music Guide and Directory. Dowling Pr. .

 Kasten, Roy (April 29, 2008), Fifteen Things You Might Not Know about The Bottle Rockets, on Their Fifteenth Birthday, Riverfront Times.
 Hogeland, William (March 14, 2004),  Emulating the Real and Vital Guthrie, Not St. Woody, New York Times.

External links

"So what is insurgent country anyway?"
alt.country: what is this stuff? from American Studies at the University of Virginia

 
Country music genres